Kalibo, officially the Municipality of Kalibo (Aklanon: Banwa it Kalibo; Hiligaynon: Banwa sang Kalibo), is a 1st class municipality and capital of the Province of Aklan, Philippines. According to the 2020 census, it has a population of 89,127 people.

Kalibo is located in the north-west of Panay. It is the main transportation hub for the resort island of Boracay. The municipality is known for the Ati-Atihan festival, the semi-urban and multi-awarded mangrove forest, the Bakhawan Eco-Park and piña-weaving which in February 2018, the National Commission for Culture and the Arts, along with the government of Aklan, began the process of nominating Kalibo piña-weaving in the UNESCO Intangible Cultural Heritage Lists. Same nomination for inclusion in the intangible cultural heritage lists is the Ati-atihan festival of the people of Aklan.

Etymology
The term Kalibo comes from the Aklanon word sangkâ líbo, ("one thousand"), reputedly the number of native Ati who attended the first Catholic Mass celebrated there. Kalibo was originally spelled as Calivo.

The town of Kalibo was originally called Akean by the inhabitants, similar to the name of the river nearby. The word akean itself connotes the warbling of running waters, from the root word akae, meaning "to boil". Akae-akae means "to bubble" or "to boil" or "to make the sound of bubbling or boiling" in the Aklanon language.

The Spaniards interchanged the names Aklan and Calivo to refer to the town. Aside from these two, other names such as Calibo, Daclan, Adan, and Calibog have been used.

History

When Miguel López de Legazpi arrived in 1569, he discovered that the town had around 2,000 inhabitants, so he recruited 500 of them to help conquer the rest of the Philippines. On November 3, 1571, it became an encomienda and on April 22, 1581, the town became a parish under the Augustinians. During the Spanish era, Kalibo was part of Capiz.

On March 17, 1897, Filipino revolutionaries march to Kalibo but lost the battle against the Spaniards. Some of them escape to the jungle.

On March 23, 1897, the Nineteen Martyrs of Aklan were executed by the Spanish colonial government for their role in the Philippine Revolution.

The town was affected by World War II being under Japanese occupation from 1941 through 1945. On November 8, 1956, the province of Aklan was officially inaugurated, and Kalibo became its capital.

Cityhood

During the early 21st century, Aklan congressman Florencio Miraflores filed a bill seeking to convert Kalibo into a city but this has yet to succeed.

Geography

According to the Philippine Statistics Authority, the municipality has a land area of  constituting  of the  total area of Aklan.

Climate

Barangays
Kalibo is politically subdivided into 16 barangays, all classified as urban. Mobo was formerly known as Tinigao Bongoe.

Demographics

In the 2020 census, Kalibo had a population of 89,127.

Language
Aklanon is the main language of Kalibo. Hiligaynon and Capiznon are also spoken as secondary languages of the municipality.

Economy

Kalibo's main industry is agriculture, based on rice, coconuts, Piña and Abaca. Handbags made of buri leaves are also some of Kalibo's exports.

Fabric from the town was used during the 1996 APEC Summit in the Philippines (Boracay, Malay, Aklan), when world leaders donned pineapple silk Barong Tagalogs during the obligatory photograph opportunity.

Kalibo also has a meat-processing industry that produces chorizo, tocino and other similar products.

Tourism in Kalibo peaks during the Ati-Atihan Festival, celebrated every second week of January and culminating on the third Sunday.

Culture

Ati-Atihan Festival

The Ati-Atihan Festival is a festival celebrated in Kalibo every second week of January and culminating on the third Sunday of the month. Revelers smear themselves with soot or any blackening substance in order to look like an Ati.

The Ati-Atihan Festival is believed to have started in the year 1212 when Borneans, led by the ten datus, traveled on balangays and crossed the Sulu Sea to land in Panay, making it the oldest festival in the Philippines.

Ati-atihan Festival was included as one of the "World's Best Festivals" by Fest300, dubbed as the "Grand Daddy of Philippine Festivals" by the Largest Travel Guide Book Publisher in the World - Lonely Planet and recognized, as well as, holds the title of "Mother of All Philippine Festivals".

Attractions

Landmarks of the town include Aklan River, the main river that flows through the town and the origin of the name of the province. Within the town proper lies Freedom Shrine which commemorates World War II veterans and the Museo it Akean, a museum of Aklan's history. Outside the town lies Bakhawan Eco-Park, a  mangrove reforestation project that began in 1990 in barangay New Buswang. Tigayon Hill and Caves in Barangay Tigayon, Kalibo which were burial sites during the pre-Hispanic era and a pit for Chinese artifacts which were excavated in the recent past.

Historical Markers
The table below is the list of Historical Markers installed by the National Historical Commission of the Philippines in Kalibo.

Transportation

Air

Air travel to Kalibo from Manila is about 45 minutes under four airlines: the Philippine Airlines, Cebu Pacific, AirAsia Zest and PAL Express. These airlines increase their flights during the Kalibo Ati-Atihan Festival every January each year.

PAL Express also flies to Cebu and Angeles. AirAsia Philippines and SeaAir also have flights to Angeles. AirAsia has a flight to Kuala Lumpur. Meanwhile, Mandarin Airlines, TransAsia Airways, China Southern, China Airlines have weekly flights to and from Taipei; Philippine Airlines and Shanghai Airlines have chartered flights to and from Shanghai; Jin Air does flights to Incheon. Spirit of Manila has its chartered flight to Kalibo from its regional destinations. Zest Air  has flights to Seoul, Busan, Shanghai, Taipei, Beijing, and Chengdu. Philippine Airlines has flights to Hong Kong and Seoul.

Kalibo is the major hub for/to Boracay. The Kalibo International Airport is about ten minutes away from Poblacion Kalibo main plaza (Pastrana Park).

Sea
Kalibo has four ports near the town. The New Washington port and the Dumaguit port are 20 minutes away from Kalibo. Batan port is accessible via Dumaguit and Altavas while the Malay port is approximately two hours. Travel time from Manila to Aklan is 14 to 18 hours through sea travel.

The Caticlan Jetty Port is part of the Roll-on Roll-off (RORO) Strong Republic Nautical Highway that connects Luzon, Visayas and Mindanao, and it passes through Kalibo to Capiz or Romblon. There is a jetty port in barangay Pook of Kalibo.

Land

Public transportation around the town is by tricycle, taxi, multicab and jeepneys.

Land travel from Iloilo City to Kalibo takes approximately three hours, one and a half hours from Roxas City, and four hours from San Jose, Antique. All are accessible by bus and minivans. Trips to Caticlan range from 70 minutes to 90 minutes depending on the mode of transportation.

Public transport

The tricycle dominates the streets in Kalibo and is the main form of public transport. The town has its own version of the design of its tricycle that can accommodate up to 8 passengers. The design was also adopted in the rest of Aklan and some parts of northern Antique. There are about 3,000 tricycles-for-hire that are registered with Sangguniang Bayan-issued franchises operating within the 16 barangays of the Municipality of Kalibo and are distributed in accordance with their following approved routes or zones of operation:

Sister cities
Kalibo has one official sister city:
  Juneau, Alaska, United States (2014)

References

External links

 
 [ Philippine Standard Geographic Code]

 
Municipalities of Aklan
Provincial capitals of the Philippines